Sabrina Soussan (born 1969 in Paris) is an engineer and manager of French and German nationality. Until December 31, 2021, Soussan has been CEO of dormakaba Holding AG, a global group in the access industry based in Switzerland where she now also lives with her family.

Sabrina Soussan is often shown as one of only a few women in high leadership positions in the male-dominated field of technology, for example in Der Spiegel, by Schweizer Radio und Fernsehen (SRF) or in a publication for the UN Climate Change Conference (UNFCCC) 2019.

Early life and education
Soussan studied mechanical and aeronautical engineering at the École Nationale Supérieure de Mécanique et d'Aérotechnique in Poitiers, France, and received her master's degree in 1992. In 1993, she completed her Masters of Business Administration (MBA) from the Université de Poitiers in France and Dublin University in Ireland.

Career
Soussan began her career at Renault in Paris as an engineer in engine research and development in 1994. From 1997 onwards, she worked in various positions at Siemens Automotive/Siemens VDO, first as project director for gasoline and diesel systems for Ford projects, then as managing director for diesel systems for the Renault-Nissan business unit, a position she initially kept after Siemens sold its Siemens VDO division to Continental.

Siemens, 2009–2021
In 2009, Soussan returned to Siemens as Head of Strategy and Marketing for Building Automation for the Building Technologies Division in Switzerland. In 2011, she became Vice President Sustainability and Energy Management in the same division before moving to the Mobility Division of Siemens in 2013, first as Vice President Commuter and Regional Trains, then as CEO of the Rolling Stock Business Unit in 2015 and as Co-CEO of Siemens Mobility, a company offering transportation solutions, from 2017 onwards.

dormakaba, 2021–2022
In April 2021, Sabrina Soussan left Siemens to succeed Riet Cadonau as CEO at dormakaba Holding AG, a global group in the access industry based in Switzerland, as of April 1, 2021. She held this position until December 31, 2021.

Suez, 2022–present
In August 22 Soussan was appointed Chairman and CEO of SUEZ SA. She joined about a year after the company was merged with rival Veolia following a much-publicized hostile takeover bid.

Other activities
 Boeing, Member-elect of the Board of Directors (since 2023)
 ITT Inc, Member of the Board of Directors (since October 2018) 
 Schaeffler AG, Member of the supervisory board(2019–2021)

References

External links 
 Sabrina Soussan Dormakaba Holding AG

1969 births
Living people
French women engineers
German women engineers
French women chief executives
French expatriates in Switzerland
German expatriates in Switzerland
University of Poitiers alumni